Michael Dustin Hicks (born 1956) is an American professor of music, poet and artist, who has studied a broad array of topics, although his work on music and the Church of Jesus Christ of Latter-day Saints has been ground-breaking in that field.

Hicks was born and raised in California. Hicks has a DMA from the University of Illinois at Urbana-Champaign. He has been on the music faculty at Brigham Young University (BYU) since 1984. Hicks has a bachelor's degree from BYU. He has been a full professor at BYU since 1996.

Hicks first book was Mormonism and Music: A History (1989). This work received awards from both the Mormon History Association and the Association of Mormon Letters. In 1990 his work Sixties Rock: Garage, Psychedelic and Other Satisfactions was published. This book received significant coverage in Music and History: Bridging the Disciplines edited by Jeffrey H. Jackson and Stanley C Pelkey. His book Henry Cowell: Bohemian was published in 2002. In 2012 his work Christian Wolff was published. In 2015 his work The Mormon Tabernacle Choir: A Biography was published. All these works have been published by Illinois University Press.

Hicks has created a variety of chamber and solo works.

From 2007 to 2010 Hicks was editor of the journal American Music published by the University of Illinois (not to be confused with the Journal of the Society for American Music which used to be published as American Music).

References

Sources
BYU faculty page of Hicks
Wall Street Journal review of Hicks' book on the Mormon Tabernacle Choir
New Music Box article

Living people
American musicologists
21st-century American composers
Brigham Young University alumni
University of Illinois alumni
Brigham Young University faculty
1956 births